"Shady Lady" is a 1970 Gene Pitney song written by Bo Gentry and Tony Lordi (of the Bel Aires), and produced by Gentry for Stateside Records. The single reached 29 in the UK.

Upon its release as a single, Billboard Magazine called the song a driving rock ballad with a strong performance by Pitney, while projecting the song to have "Hot 100 and sales potency".

References

Gene Pitney songs
1970 songs
1970 singles
Rock ballads
Songs written by Bo Gentry